Nyali is a residential area and Sub-County within Mombasa City, located on the mainland north of Mombasa County. It is connected to Mombasa Island by the New Nyali Bridge. 
Nyali is known for its many high-class hotels and residential houses, modern standards, and long white sand beaches making it a popular destination for both local and foreign tourists.

Description 

Nyali has become a very westernized residential area, relatively autonomous with two Naivas supermarkets, a cinema multiplex (Nyali Cinemax), shopping malls, banks, schools, and post offices. All this prevents its residents from having to cross the overcrowded Nyali Bridge to get to the busy center of Mombasa.

In Nyali are found many interesting places like the Mamba Village(the biggest crocodile farm in Africa), Nyali Golf Club, Dwarikadham Hindu temple, Lord Shiva Gombeshwar Caves, numerous embassies and some of the most prestigious academic institutions of the coastal province.

Tourism 
Nyali is renowned for its tourist potential, thanks to its calm water, its accommodation facilities and its coast bordered with white sand beaches protected by a coral reef, loved by divers. This is a part of the Mombasa Marine Reserve, managed by Kenya Wildlife Service.

Nyali also shelters many luxury hotels on almost all the seaside (Sai Rock Hotel & Spa, Sarova Whitesands, Nyali Beach Resort, Voyager Hotel, Reef Hotel, Mombasa Beach Hotel), alternating with more affordable hotels (Backpackers Hotel) and with numerous places of entertainment and activities for the tourists (beach volley, windsurfing, scuba diving, kite surf, jet skiing, sailing...).

References 

Populated places in Coast Province